HD 92845 (HR 4194) is a probable astrometric binary in the southern constellation Antlia. It has an apparent magnitude of 5.62, allowing it to be faintly seen with the naked eye.

HD 92845 has a stellar classification of A0 V, indicating that it is an ordinary A-type main-sequence star. However, stellar evolution models from Zorec and Royer reveal it to be a subgiant that has just left the main sequence.

References

Antlia
092845
A-type main-sequence stars
4194
052407
CD-32 07572
Astrometric binaries
Antliae, 78
Subgiant stars